The Honda Winner is an underbone motorcycle from the Japanese manufacturer Honda. It was launched in April 2016 in Vietnam. It was also launched in May 2016 in Indonesia as the Supra GTR. In June 2016, the bike was launched in Malaysia as the RS150R. The engine is shared with the 2015 Sonic 150R, 2015 CB150R (StreetFire), and 2016 CBR150R. With the engine producing , it makes the Winner as the fastest and most powerful 4-stroke underbone model ever offered by Honda, along with the Sonic.

The Winner received an update in July 2019, dubbed as Winner X. The Indonesian-market Supra GTR received a more minor update on 23 September 2019.

The Winner X received a minor update in December 2021.

Performance 
Some performance tests listed here were conducted by Otomotif tabloid from Indonesia in June 2016.

References

External links 

  (Malaysia)

Winner
Winner
Motorcycles introduced in 2016